Sheila Tracy (née Lugg; 10 January 1934 – 30 September 2014) was a British broadcaster, writer, musician, and singer. She began her career as a trombone player during the 1950s. in all-female bands.

Biography
Sheila Lugg was born in Mullion, Cornwall in 1934. She attended Truro Girls School and studied piano, violin and trombone at the Royal Academy of Music, then was a member of the Ivy Benson All Girls Band between 1956 and 1958. Subsequently, she formed a vocal/trombone duo, The Tracy Sisters, who appeared in variety, on radio and television, as well as in cabaret all over the world. When the act broke up, she joined BBC Television as an announcer and worked mostly in television until 1974 when she became the first female newsreader on BBC Radio 4 on 16 July. She also qualified as a Special Policewoman in London.

On BBC Radio 2 Tracy devised and presented the Truckers' Hour, based on a format she had learnt about on a visit to the USA.

Two of the books she wrote are Bands, Booze & Broads (1995), a collection of her interviews with the American sidemen who played with the top bands in the 1930s, 1940s and 1950s; and Talking Swing (1997), on British musicians of the same era. She became a popular lecturer on P&O Cruises and wrote two other reference works.

In 1997, she was given the Freedom of the City of London and became an Associate of the Royal Academy of Music. She was a former President of the British Trombone Society. She was married to actor John Arnatt from 1962 until his death in 1999. The couple had one son, born in 1965.

Tracy died at the age of 80, on 30 September 2014, at the Princess Alice Hospice in Esher, Surrey. She was survived by her son.

Books
1983, Who’s Who on Radio
1984, Who’s Who in Popular Music
1995, Bands, Booze And Broads, Edinburgh: Mainstream Publishing, 
1997, Talking Swing: British Big Bands, Edinburgh: Mainstream Publishing,

References

External links

 British Trombone Society
 Ivy Benson Big Band website

1934 births
2014 deaths
Alumni of the Royal Academy of Music
British jazz trombonists
British radio personalities
British women writers
People educated at Truro High School
People from Cornwall